Madonna has worked in twenty-seven feature films (twenty-two as an actress), ten short films, three theatrical plays, ten television episodes, and appeared in sixteen commercials. Madonna's acting career has attracted a largely negative reception from critics. Stephanie Zacharek from Salon stated: "[Madonna] seems wooden and unnatural as an actress, and it's tough to watch, because she's clearly trying her damnedest."

Her first foray documented into screen acting, is a one-minute student film called The Egg (filmed around 1974 or 1976). In 1979, before her breakthrough, she made her acting debut in the low-budget feature A Certain Sacrifice; its release was delayed for several years until 1985 to capitalize on the popularity of her second studio album, Like a Virgin. That same year, she made a cameo appearance as a club singer in the film Vision Quest; and garnered commercial and critical success for the title role in Susan Seidelman's Desperately Seeking Susan, which was her first  first major screen role. The following year, she made her theatrical debut in David Rabe's Goose and Tom-Tom and her first commercial for Mitsubishi in Japan. She also starred opposite her then-husband actor Sean Penn in the adventure drama Shanghai Surprise (1986), which was panned by critics and earned Madonna her first Golden Raspberry Award for Worst Actress. Her follow-up films Who's That Girl (1987) and Bloodhounds of Broadway (1989) were also critical and commercial failures. She teamed with Pepsi-Cola in 1989 for a commercial to launch the single "Like a Prayer", but the commercial was revoked and her contract with Pepsi cancelled due to controversy surrounding the song's music video.

In 1990, Madonna starred as Breathless Mahoney in Warren Beatty's Dick Tracy, an adaption of Chester Gould's comic strip starring the character of the same name. Starring opposite Beatty and Al Pacino, Madonna received a Saturn Award nomination for Best Actress. The following year, the documentary Madonna: Truth or Dare showcased Madonna behind the scenes of her 1990 Blond Ambition World Tour and became the highest-grossing documentary of all time at that point. She also received positive reviews for her role in the ensemble sports comedy-drama A League of Their Own (1992), which centered on a women's baseball team during World War II. However, her performance in the erotic thriller Body of Evidence was widely panned, and the film was a commercial failure. She cameoed in several films over the next few years, such as Blue in the Face (1995) and Spike Lee's Girl 6 (1996), until starring in the 1996 film adaptation of Andrew Lloyd Webber's musical Evita. Her performance as Eva Perón was acclaimed by critics and won her a Golden Globe Award for Best Actress – Motion Picture Musical or Comedy.

Following a musical comeback in the late 1990s, Madonna again returned to acting with the romantic comedies The Next Best Thing (2000) and Swept Away (2002), the latter of which was a remake of Lina Wertmüller's Italian film of the same name directed by her then-husband director Guy Ritchie. Both films were critical and commercial failures, with Swept Away earning Madonna another Golden Raspberry Award for Worst Actress. She also had a cameo appearance in and performed the theme song of the James Bond film Die Another Day (2002) and guest starred on the NBC sitcom Will & Grace in April 2003. In 2006, she made her final major acting appearance to date with a voice role in Arthur and the Invisibles.

In the 2000s, Madonna has largely moved away from acting to focus on roles behind the camera. She served as executive producer of the teen comedy action film Agent Cody Banks (2003), as well as its sequel the following year. She made her directorial debut with the comedy-drama Filth and Wisdom (2008), and followed up with the biographical film W.E. (2011). Madonna has also focused on projects focusing on artistic freedom and human rights, producing and writing the documentary I Am Because We Are and co-directing the short film secretprojectrevolution (2013) with Steven Klein.

Feature films

Short films

Theatrical plays

Television

Commercials

See also
 List of films considered the worst

References

Citations

Book sources

External links
Madonna Films at Madonna.com

Actress filmographies
American filmographies
Filmography